Mohammad Vali Mirza (1890–1988) was the third son of Persian Qajar nobleman Abdol Hossein Mirza Farmanfarma  and his wife Princess Ezzat-Dowleh.

Life

Since his youth, Mohammad Vali had spent a great deal of time in Iranian Azerbaijan, where he owned considerable estates. Consequently, even in language, he preferred Azerbaijani to the nationally dominant Persian. 

His roots to Iranian Azerbaijan were revealed when at the age of 26, he earned a prominent position in the Majles (Iranian parliament) as the representative of Tabriz. Working through the Majles, he invited American advisors to help reform the military, rural security system, gendarmerie, and public financial sector. 

Many advisors came including Colonel Norman Schwarzkopf and Dr Arthur Millspaugh who had previously been an advisor to Iran in the 1920s.

Throughout his life, Mohammad Vali built a reputation for being a fair person and an excellent mediator.

When his father and brothers were imprisoned during the 1921 coup that brought the Pahlavi dynasty to power Mohammad Vali Mirza escaped to Baghdad. Afterwards, he returned to live in virtual seclusion under Reza Shah. He died at the age of 92.

Anecdote
At the end of World War I, when the Russian Communists seized many properties in Azerbaijan, Mohammad Vali Mirza travelled to Moscow to settle accounts. Disguised as a beggar, he crossed the mountain passes of Turkey on his way north but was captured by a Venezuelan general named Rafael de Nogales, who was fighting on the German side and almost shot him as a spy. Mohammad Vali Mirza escaped only at the last minute because he spoke to the general in French, prompting the general to realize, as Nogales wrote in his memoirs, "that he was a prince of the lineage of Farman Farma." Afterward the two became friends, and Mohammad Vali Mirza later bestowed a medal on Nogales in gratitude.

After the 1979 revolution he left Iran for Geneva, Switzerland with his family and not to return to Iran until he died at the age of 98.

Government positions held
 Financial Agent at Tabriz, 1916–1917
 Head of Finance Department at Tabriz, 1945–1946 
 Minister of Parliament in 4th, 5th, and 6th Majles from Tabriz
 Minister of Parliament in 13th and 14th Majles from Sarab

See also
 Iran
 History of Iran
 Qajar dynasty

Sources
Daughter of Persia; Sattareh Farman Farmaian with Dona Munker; Crown Publishers, Inc.,New York,1992
Blood and Oil: Memoirs of a Persian Prince, Manucher Mirza Farman Farmaian Random House, New York, 1997.

External links 
The Qajar (Kadjar) Pages
Qajars Dynasty Turkoman dynasty of the Shahs of Persia

Qajar princes
1890s births
1983 deaths
Iranian emigrants to Switzerland
Exiles of the Iranian Revolution in Switzerland
Democrat Party of Iran politicians
Members of the 14th Iranian Majlis
Deputies of Tabriz for National Consultative Assembly
Farmanfarmaian family